Víctor Alberto Ramos (born 1945) is an Argentine geologist who has contributed to the paleogeography and plate tectonics of South America. He has been a member of the Chilean Academy of Science since 2001 and won in 2013 the Premio México de Ciencia y Tecnología.

Ramos was the first to recognize the existence of Chilenia and the former sea that separated it from the rest of South America (then part of Gondwana). At the time of the discovery in the 1980s it was considered to be speculative. In a 1988 conference in Chile the discovery of Chilenia was not well received and a payador at the conference ridiculed him. As the existence of Chilenia was recognized, he was made a member of the Chilean Academy of Sciences.

Together with other researchers Ramos has proposed to change the age of the Jurassic-Cretaceous boundary from 145 Ma to 140 Ma making the Jurassic longer. This proposal derives from a 2014 study based on biostratigraphy and radiometric dating of ash in the Vaca Muerta Formation in Neuquén Basin, Argentina. In Ramos' words the study would serve as a "first step" toward formally changing the age in the International Union of Geological Sciences.

Ramos has proposed that the Patagonian landmass originated as an allochtonous terrane that separated from Antarctica and docked in South America 250 to 270 Ma in the Permian period. A 2014 study by Robert John Pankhurst and co-workers reject the idea of a far-travelled Patagonia claiming it is likely of parautochthonous (nearby) origin.

Víctor Ramos has been a visiting professor at:
Universidade Federal de Ouro Preto, Brazil
Cornell University, United States
Universidad de Chile, Chile
Universidad Nacional de Salta, Argentina
Universidad Nacional de San Juan, Argentina
Universidad Nacional de San Luis, Argentina
Universidade Federal do Rio Grande do Sul, Brazil
University of São Paulo, Brazil
Universidad Nacional del Sur, Argentina
Universidad Nacional de Córdoba, Argentina
Universidad Nacional de Asunción, Paraguay
Universidad de la República, Uruguay

References

Living people
1945 births
Argentine geologists
Tectonicists
University of Buenos Aires alumni
Academic staff of the University of Buenos Aires
Cornell University faculty
Academic staff of the University of Chile
Fellows of the Geological Society of America
Members of the Brazilian Academy of Sciences
Members of the Chilean Academy of Sciences
Foreign associates of the National Academy of Sciences
Servicio Geológico Minero personnel